Aybak, Afghanistan may refer to

 Aybak, Helmand Province, Afghanistan
 Aybak, Herat Province, Afghanistan
 Haibak, Samangan Province, Afghanistan